Journey Through Rosebud is a 1972 drama film directed by Tom Gries. It stars Robert Forster and Katharine Ross.

Cast
Robert Forster as Frank
Kristoffer Tabori as Danny
Victoria Racimo as Shirley
Eddie Little Sky as Stanley Pike
Roy Jenson as Park Ranger
Hal Jason Fuller Sr. as the boy who enters the tribal office to deliver a message
Wright King as an Indian agent

See also
 List of American films of 1972

References

External links

1972 films
1972 drama films
American drama films
American independent films
Films scored by Johnny Mandel
Films directed by Tom Gries
Films set in South Dakota
Films shot in South Dakota
1970s English-language films
1970s American films